is a Japanese Professional baseball pitcher for the Fukuoka SoftBank Hawks of Nippon Professional Baseball.

Early Baseball career
Okamoto participated in the 3rd grade spring 82nd Japanese High School Baseball Invitational Tournament as an ace pitcher at Kobe International University Attached High School.

In 2013, He won the 39th Japan Corporate Baseball Leaguel Championship as the Nippon Steel Kazusa Magic pitcher and was chosen as a Most valuable player.

Professional career
On October 24, 2013, Okamoto was drafted by the Fukuoka Softbank Hawks in the 2013 Nippon Professional Baseball draft.

References

External links

NPB.jp

1992 births
Living people
Fukuoka SoftBank Hawks players
Japanese baseball players
Nippon Professional Baseball pitchers
Baseball people from Hyōgo Prefecture